R. Randolph Brinson (born 1957) is a political activist and physician sub-specializing in gastroenterology from Montgomery, Alabama. In 2003 Brinson founded Redeem the Vote, an organization originally modeled after the youth-vote Rock the Vote campaign to register young people of faith to vote. The organization has since moved to issue advocacy and mobilization of an email list self-reported at 71 million names.

A lifelong Republican, Brinson grew up in Jacksonville, Florida and went to boarding school in South Carolina, where he worked on the successful gubernatorial campaign of James Burrows Edwards, the first Republican since the Reconstruction Era to hold that office. He attended Valdosta State College, where he met his wife, Pamela Bennett.  After attending the Medical College of Georgia he was a resident at the University of Florida College of Medicine. He completed his gastroenterology fellowship back at the Medical College of Georgia, then moved to Alabama.

From 1987 to 1989 Brinson was staff gastroenterologist at Maxwell Air Force Base and then went into private practice. In the late 1990s he advised governor of Alabama Fob James on health-care issues and helped found the Christian music radio network WAY-FM. He serves on the state board of the Fellowship of Christian Athletes, and the Board of Trustees for the University of Mobile.

Redeem the Vote and other activism 

Brinson founded Redeem the Vote in 2003. In February 2004, Brinson attended a national religious broadcaster convention and met the marketing firm for Mel Gibson's The Passion of the Christ, whom he hired to promote the organization.

By October 2004, Redeem the Vote had enlisted 47 Contemporary Christian music groups,  including Steven Curtis Chapman, Point of Grace, Jeremy Camp, FFH and Jaci Velasquez, to register young evangelicals and promote political participation. 
Sponsors included Sean Hannity and Fox News, the American Tract Society, Focus on the Family, FamilyNet and the Gospel Music Association. Gov. Mike Huckabee of Arkansas, Chuck Colson of Prison Fellowship and Gary Bauer of American Values were members of the national advisory board.

The group estimated it registered between 70,000 and 78,000 members based on the 30,000 forms distributed at concerts and 40,000 over the Internet.

Meanwhile, its email list grew in connection with the promotions for "Passion of the Christ," reaching 12 million addresses by the election. A video message recorded by Christ portrayer Jim Caviezel was shown in churches across the country and e-mailed to more than 60 million people.

In order to preserve the God-given freedoms we each hold dear, it's important that we let our voices be heard. Voting is not only a privilege, but also an important responsibility to let your voice be heard. It's critical that you participate in the political process, and we encourage you to get involved. Together we can make a difference by voting on Nov. 2. See you at the polls.

More recently, during the 2008 Republican nomination campaign, Brinson's group partnered with the Mike Huckabee campaign. Huckabee had been an RTV national chairman in 2004, and the Huckabee campaign showed the most interest when a Redeem the Vote list manager, Webcasting TV, pitched their services. RTV claims to now have 71 million addresses, 25 million belonging to "25 and 45 years old, upwardly mobile, right-of-center, conservative households." The campaign got over 414,000 Iowa contacts from Brinson's list, which is four times the expected participation in the Iowa caucuses.

References

External links 
 Randy Brinson Bio at Redeem the Vote

1957 births
Activists from Alabama
Alabama Republicans
American gastroenterologists
American political activists
Christians from Alabama
Georgia Health Sciences University alumni
Living people
People from Jacksonville, Florida
Politicians from Montgomery, Alabama
University of Mobile
Valdosta State University alumni